The 1976 Giro d'Italia was the 59th edition of the Giro d'Italia, one of cycling's Grand Tours. The Giro began in Catania on 21 May, and Stage 11 occurred on 31 May with a flat stage to Gabicce Mare. The race finished in Milan on 12 June.

Stage 1a
21 May 1976 — Catania to Catania,

Stage 1b
21 May 1976 — Catania to Siracusa,

Stage 2
22 May 1976 — Siracusa to Caltanissetta,

Stage 3
23 May 1976 — Caltanissetta to Palermo,

Stage 4
24 May 1976 — Cefalù to Messina,

Stage 5
25 May 1976 — Reggio Calabria to Cosenza,

Stage 6
26 May 1976 — Cosenza to Matera,

Stage 7
27 May 1976 — Ostuni to Ostuni,  (ITT)

Stage 8
28 May 1976 —  to Lago Laceno,

Stage 9
29 May 1976 — Bagnoli Irpino to Roccaraso,

Stage 10
30 May 1976 — Roccaraso to Terni,

Stage 11
31 May 1976 — Terni to Gabicce Mare,

References

1976 Giro d'Italia
Giro d'Italia stages